The Catholic Church in Yemen is part of the worldwide Catholic Church, under the spiritual leadership of the Pope in Rome. There are three thousand Catholics and four parishes in the country, which forms part of the Vicariate Apostolic of Southern Arabia which also includes several other countries in the Arabian peninsula. Most Catholics are temporary foreign workers living in the country with their families.

Persecution
Three nuns who were members of the Missionaries of Charity were killed in Hodeida 1998. In the same year, Yemen and the Vatican established diplomatic relations. On 4 March 2016, terrorists of uncertain affiliation attacked a Catholic home for the elderly in Aden, killing sixteen people including four missionary sisters of the Missionaries of Charity and some local Muslim workers.

Churches
There are four Catholic parishes in Yemen:

 Sacred Heart of Jesus Church, Hodeidah
 St. Francis of Assisi Church, Aden
 St. Mary Help of Christians Church, Sana'a
 St. Theresa of the Child Jesus Church, Taiz

References

External links
 http://www.gcatholic.org/churches/local/arab0.htm

 
Yemen
Yemen
Apostolic Vicariate of Southern Arabia
Catholic Church in the Arabian Peninsula